The Sino-Vietnamese War (also known by other names) was a border war fought between China and Vietnam in early 1979. China launched an offensive in response to Vietnam's actions against the Khmer Rouge in 1978, which ended the rule of the Chinese-backed Khmer Rouge. Both China and Vietnam claimed victory in the last of the Indochina Wars.

Chinese forces invaded northern Vietnam and captured several cities near the border. On 6 March 1979, China declared that the gate to Hanoi was open and that their punitive mission had been achieved. Chinese troops then withdrew from Vietnam. As Vietnamese troops remained in Cambodia until 1989, China was unsuccessful in its goal of dissuading Vietnam from involvement in Cambodia. Following the dissolution of the Soviet Union in 1991, the Sino-Vietnamese border was finalized. Although unable to deter Vietnam from ousting Pol Pot from Cambodia, China demonstrated that its Cold War communist adversary, the Soviet Union, was unable to protect its Vietnamese ally.

Names
The Sino-Vietnamese War is known by various names in Chinese and Vietnamese. The Chinese government refers to the war as the "Self-defensive war against Vietnam" or the "Self-defensive counterattack against Vietnam". The Vietnamese government calls it the "War against Chinese expansionism".

The Sino-Vietnamese War is also known as the Third Indochina War in Western historiography.

Background
Just as the First Indochina War—which emerged from the complex situation following World War II—and the Vietnam War both exploded from the unresolved aftermath of political relations, the Third Indochina War again followed the unresolved problems of the earlier wars.

The major allied victors of World War II, the United Kingdom, the United States, and the Soviet Union, all agreed that the area belonged to the French. As the French did not have the means to immediately retake Indochina, the major powers agreed that the British would take control and troops would occupy the south while Nationalist Chinese forces would move in from the north. Nationalist Chinese troops entered the country to disarm Japanese troops north of the 16th parallel on 14 September 1945. The parallel divided Indochina into Chinese and British controlled zones (see Timeline of World War II (1945)). The British landed in the south rearming the small body of interned French forces as well as parts of the surrendered Japanese forces to aid in retaking southern Vietnam, as there were not enough British troops immediately available.

On the urging of the Soviet Union, Ho Chi Minh initially attempted to negotiate with the French, who were slowly reestablishing their control across the area, although still under British control until hostilities had ceased. Once hostilities had ended, the British handed over the territory to the French. In January 1946, the Viet Minh won elections across central and northern Vietnam. On 6 March 1946, Ho signed an agreement allowing French forces to replace Nationalist Chinese forces, in exchange for French recognition of the Democratic Republic of Vietnam as a "free" republic within the French Union, with the specifics of such recognition to be determined by future negotiation. British forces departed on 26 March 1946, leaving Vietnam in the control of the French. The French landed in Hanoi by March 1946 and in November of that year they ousted the Viet Minh from the city. Soon thereafter, the Viet Minh began a guerrilla war against the French Union forces, beginning the first Indochina War.

French colonialism and the First Indochina War

Vietnam first became a French colony when France invaded in 1858. By the 1880s, the French had expanded their sphere of influence in Southeast Asia to include all of Vietnam, and by 1893 both Laos and Cambodia had become French colonies as well. Rebellions against French colonial power were common up to World War I. The European war heightened revolutionary sentiment in Southeast Asia, and the independence-minded population rallied around revolutionaries such as Hồ Chí Minh and others, including royalists.

Prior to their attack on Pearl Harbor, the Japanese occupied French Indochina, but left civil administration to the Vichy French administration. On 9 March 1945, fearing that the Vichy French were about to switch sides to support the Allies, the Japanese overthrew the Vichy administration and forces taking control of Indochina and establishing their own puppet administration, the Empire of Vietnam. The Japanese surrender in August 1945 created a power vacuum in Indochina, as the various political factions scrambled for control.

The events leading to the First Indochina War are subject to historical dispute. When the Việt Minh hastily sought to establish the Democratic Republic of Vietnam, the remaining French acquiesced while waiting for the return of French forces to the region. The Kuomintang supported French restoration, but Viet Minh efforts towards independence were helped by Chinese communists under the Soviet Union's influence. The Soviet Union at first indirectly supported Vietnamese communists, but later directly supported Hồ Chí Minh. The Soviets nonetheless remained less supportive than China until after the Sino-Soviet split, during the time of Leonid Brezhnev when the Soviet Union became communist Vietnam's key ally.

The war itself involved numerous events that had major impacts throughout Indochina. Two major conferences were held to bring about a resolution. Finally, on 20 July 1954, the Geneva Conference resulted in a political settlement to reunite the country, signed with support from China, the Soviet Union, and Western European powers. While the Soviet Union played a constructive role in the agreement, it again was not as involved as China. The U.S. did not sign the agreement and swiftly moved to back South Vietnam.

Sino-Soviet split

The Chinese Communist Party and the Viet Minh had a long history. During the initial stages of the First Indochina War with France, the recently founded communist People's Republic of China continued the Soviet mission to expand communism. Therefore, they aided the Viet Minh and became the connector between Soviets and the Viet Minh. In early 1950, the Viet Minh fought independently from the Chinese Military Advisory Group under Wei Guoqing. This was one of the reasons for China to cut the arms support for the Viet Minh.

After the death of Joseph Stalin in March 1953, relations between the Soviet Union and China began to deteriorate. Mao Zedong believed the new Soviet leader Nikita Khrushchev had made a serious error in his Secret Speech denouncing Stalin in February 1956, and criticized the Soviet Union's interpretation of Marxism–Leninism, in particular Khrushchev's support for peaceful co-existence and its interpretation. This led to increasingly hostile relations, and eventually the Sino-Soviet split. From here, Chinese communists played a decreasing role in helping their former allies because the Viet Minh did not support China against the Soviets.

Following worsening relations between the Soviet Union and China as a result of the Sino-Soviet split of 1956–1966, as many as 1.5 million Chinese troops were stationed along the Sino-Soviet border in preparation for a full-scale war against the Soviets.

Vietnam antagonized China by increasing its alignment with the Soviet Union by joining the Council for Mutual Economic Assistance (CMEA) (and signing the Treaty of Friendship and Co-operation with the Soviet Union, which had the Soviet Union pledge to aid Vietnam if attacked.

Following the death of Mao in September 1976, the overthrow of the Gang of Four and the ascent of Deng Xiaoping, the Chinese leadership revised its own positions to become compatible with market aspects, denounced the Cultural Revolution, and collaborated with the US against the Soviet Union.

Vietnam War

As France withdrew from a provisionally divided Vietnam in late 1954, the United States increasingly stepped in to support the South Vietnamese leaders due to the Domino theory, which theorized that if one nation would turn to communism, the surrounding nations were likely to fall like dominoes and become communist as well. The Soviet Union and North Vietnam became important allies together due to the fact that if South Vietnam was successfully taken over by North Vietnam, then communism in the far east would find its strategic position bolstered. In the eyes of the People's Republic of China, the growing Soviet-Vietnamese relationship was a disturbing development; they feared an encirclement by the less-than-hospitable Soviet sphere of influence.

The United States and the Soviet Union could not agree on a plan for a proposed 1956 election meant to unify the partitioned Vietnam. Instead, the South held a separate election that was widely considered fraudulent, leading to continued internal conflict with communist factions led by the Viet Cong that intensified through the late 1950s. With supplies and support from the Soviet Union, North Vietnamese forces became directly involved in the ongoing guerrilla war by 1959 and openly invaded the South in 1964.

The United States played an ever-increasing role in supporting South Vietnam through the period. The U.S. had supported French forces in the First Indochina War, sent supplies and military advisers to South Vietnam throughout the 1950s and early 1960s, and eventually took over most of the fighting against both North Vietnam and the Viet Cong by the mid-1960s. By 1968, over 500,000 American troops were involved in the Vietnam War. Due to a lack of clear military success and facing increasingly strident opposition to the war in the U.S., American forces began a slow withdrawal in 1969 while attempting to bolster South Vietnam's military so that they could take over the fighting. In accordance with the Paris Peace Accords by 29 March 1973 all U.S. combat forces had left South Vietnam, however North Vietnamese combat forces were allowed to remain in place. North Vietnam attacked South Vietnam in early 1975 and South Vietnam fell on 30 April 1975.

The People's Republic of China started talks with the United States in the early 1970s, culminating in high level meetings with Henry Kissinger and later Richard Nixon. These meetings contributed to a re-orientation of Chinese foreign policy toward the United States.

Cambodia

Although the Vietnamese Communists and the Khmer Rouge had previously cooperated, the relationship deteriorated when Khmer Rouge leader Pol Pot came to power and established Democratic Kampuchea on 17 April 1975. The People's Republic of China, on the other hand, also supported the Maoist Khmer Rouge against Lon Nol's regime during the Cambodian Civil War and its subsequent take-over of Cambodia. China provided extensive political, logistical and military support for the Khmer Rouge during its rule. After numerous clashes along the border between Vietnam and Cambodia, and with encouragement from Khmer Rouge defectors fleeing purges of the Eastern Zone, Vietnam invaded Cambodia on 25 December 1978. By 7 January 1979 Vietnamese forces had entered Phnom Penh and the Khmer Rouge leadership had fled to western Cambodia. The offensive took the Chinese by surprise, and its Phnom Penh embassy fled to the jungle with the Khmer Rouge where it remained for 15 days.

The fall of the Khmer Rouge was not a surprise, but from China's perspective, Vietnam's occupation of Cambodia threatened China's interests on the Indochina peninsula and its position among non-communist ASEAN states of Southeast Asia. Members of ASEAN saw Vietnam's invasion of Cambodia as a blatant violation of international borders and an act of aggression.

Ethnic minorities

China supported the ethnic minority United Front for the Liberation of Oppressed Races against Vietnam during the FULRO insurgency against Vietnam.

The Vietnamese government also began persecuting overseas Chinese living in Vietnam in the late 1970s. Vietnamese authorities confiscated property owned by overseas Chinese, and expelled many Chinese from Vietnam and to a number of provinces in southern China.

The Vietnamese executed collaborators who worked for the Chinese, regardless of ethnicity.

The Chinese received a significant number of defectors from the Thu Lao ethnic minority in Vietnam during the war. During the war China received as migrants the entire A Lù based population of the Phù Lá ethnic minority. China received so many defectors from the ethnic minorities in Vietnam that it raised shock among Vietnam which had to launch a new effort to re-assert dominance over the ethnic minorities and classify them. Post Vietnam War, insurgency against Vietnam lasted among the indigenous Mon-Khmer and Malayo-Polynesians of the Central Highlands. Assistance was sought from China by the Hmong ethnic minority. The border was frequently crossed by Chinese, Lao, Kinh, Hmong, Yao, Nung, and Tai. The Laotian Hmong and FULRO were both supported against Vietnam by China and Thailand.

China attacks Vietnam
China, now under Deng Xiaoping, was starting the Chinese economic reform and opening trade with the West, in turn, growing increasingly defiant of the Soviet Union. China grew concerned about the strong Soviet influence in Vietnam, fearing that Vietnam could become a pseudo-protectorate of the Soviet Union. Vietnam's claim to be the world's third largest military power following its victory in the Vietnam War also increased Chinese apprehensions. In the Chinese view, Vietnam was pursuing a regional hegemonic policy in an attempt to control Indochina. In July 1978, the Chinese Politburo discussed possible military action against Vietnam in order to disrupt Soviet deployments and, two months later, PLA General Staff recommended punitive actions against Vietnam.

The major breakdown in the Chinese view of Vietnam occurred in November 1978. Vietnam joined the CMEA and, on 3 November, the Soviet Union and Vietnam signed a 25-year mutual defense treaty, which made Vietnam the "linchpin" in the Soviet Union's "drive to contain China" (however, the Soviet Union had shifted from open animosity towards more normalized relations with China soon after). Vietnam called for a special relationship between the three Indochinese countries, but the Khmer Rouge regime of Democratic Kampuchea rejected the idea. On 25 December 1978, Vietnam invaded Democratic Kampuchea, overrunning most of the country, deposing the Khmer Rouge, and installing Heng Samrin as the head of the new Cambodian government. The move antagonized China, which now viewed the Soviet Union as capable of encircling its southern border.

On 29 January 1979, Chinese Vice-premier Deng Xiaoping visited the United States for the first time and told American president Jimmy Carter: "The child is getting naughty, it is time he got spanked". Deng sought an endorsement from the United States in order to deter the Soviet Union from intervening when China launched a punitive attack against Vietnam. He informed Carter that China could not accept Vietnam's "wild ambitions" and was prepared to teach it a lesson. According to United States National Security Advisor Zbigniew Brzezinski, Carter reserved judgment, an action which Chinese diplomats interpreted as tacit approval. 

Deng returned to China on 8 February 1979, and on 9 February, made the final decision to invade Vietnam. On 15 February, the first day that China could have officially announced the termination of the 1950 Sino-Soviet Treaty of Friendship, Alliance and Mutual Assistance, Deng Xiaoping declared that China planned to conduct a limited attack on Vietnam. Thus, he further developed China's burgeoning cooperation with the United States against the Soviet Union and would take a similar stance later regarding Afghanistan. According to academic Suisheng Zhao, "The proximity in the timing of the military thrust [against Vietnam] to take advantage of the normalization to bluff the Soviets with a nonexistent US endorsement."

The reason cited for the attack was to support China's ally, the Khmer Rouge of Cambodia, in addition to the mistreatment of Vietnam's ethnic Chinese minority and the Vietnamese occupation of the Spratly Islands which were claimed by China. To prevent Soviet intervention on Vietnam's behalf, Deng warned Moscow the next day that China was prepared for a full-scale war against the Soviet Union; in preparation for this conflict, China put all of its troops along the Sino-Soviet border on an emergency war alert, set up a new military command in Xinjiang, and even evacuated an estimated 300,000 civilians from the Sino-Soviet border. In addition, the bulk of China's active forces (as many as one-and-a-half million troops) were stationed along China's border with the Soviet Union.

Order of battle

Chinese forces
Although the People's Liberation Army vastly outnumbered the Vietnamese forces, the Soviet-Vietnamese alliance compelled the Chinese to deploy the majority of their forces along China's northern frontier with the Soviet Union (as well as, to a lesser extent, Soviet-allied Mongolia) as a deterrent to Soviet intervention.

The Chinese force that engaged the Vietnamese consisted of units from the Kunming Military Region, Chengdu Military Region, Wuhan Military Region and Guangzhou Military Region, but commanded by the headquarters of Kunming Military Region on the western front and Guangzhou Military Region in the eastern front.
Guangxi Direction (East Front) commanded by the Front Headquarter of Guangzhou Military Region in Nanning. Commander-Xu Shiyou, Political Commissar-Xiang Zhonghua, Chief of Staff-Zhou Deli
North Group: Commander-Ou Zhifu (Deputy Commander of Guangzhou Military Region)
41st Army Commander-Zhang Xudeng, Political Commissar-Liu Zhanrong
121st Infantry Division Commander-Zheng Wenshui
122nd Infantry Division Commander-Li Xinliang
123rd Infantry Division Commander-Li Peijiang
South Group: Commander-Wu Zhong (Deputy Commander of Guangzhou Military Region)
42nd Army Commander-Wei Huajie, Political Commissar-Xun Li
124th Infantry Division Commander-Gu Hui
125th Infantry Division
126th Infantry Division
East Group: Commander-Jiang Xieyuan (Deputy Commander of Guangzhou Military Region)
55th Army Commander-Zhu Yuehua, Temporary Political Commissar-Guo Changzeng
163rd Infantry Division Commander-Bian Guixiang, Political Commissar-Wu Enqing, Chief of Staff-Xing Shizhong
164th Infantry Division Commander-Xiao Xuchu (also Deputy Commander of 55th Corps)
165th Infantry Division
1st Artillery Division
Reserve Group (came from Wuhan Military Region except 50th Corps from Chengdu Military Region), Deputy Commander-Han Huaizhi (Commander of 54th Corps)
43rd Army Commander-Zhu Chuanyu, Temporary Political Commissar-Zhao Shengchang
127th Infantry Division Commander-Zhang Wannian (also as the Deputy Commander of 43rd Corps)
128th Infantry Division
129th Infantry Division
54th Army Commander-Han Huaizhi (pluralism), Political Commissar-Zhu Zhiwei
160th Infantry Division (commanded by 41st Corp in this war) Commander-Zhang Zhixin, Political Commissar-Li Zhaogui
161st Infantry Division
162nd Infantry Division Commander-Li Jiulong
50th Army Temporary Commander-Liu Guangtong, Political Commissar-Gao Xingyao
148th Infantry Division
150th Infantry Division
20th Army (only dispatched the 58th Division into the war)
58th Infantry Division (commanded by the 50th Corps during the war)
Guangxi Military Region (as a provincial military region) Commander-Zhao Xinran Chief of Staff-Yin Xi
1st Regiment of Frontier Defense in Youyiguan Pass
2nd Regiment of Frontier Defense in Baise District
3rd Regiment of Frontier Defense in Fangcheng County
The Independent Infantry Division of Guangxi Military Region
Air Force of Guangzhou Military Region (armed patrol in the sky of Guangxi, did not see combat)
7th Air Force Corps
13th Air Force Division (aerotransport unit came from Hubei province)
70th Antiaircraft Artillery Division
The 217 Fleet of South Sea Fleet
8th Navy Aviation Division
The Independent Tank Regiment of Guangzhou Military Region
83rd Bateau Boat Regiment
84th Bateau Boat Regiment
Yunnan Direction (the West Front) commanded by the Front Headquarter of Kunming Military Region in Kaiyuan. Commander-Yang Dezhi, Political Commissar-Liu Zhijian, Chief of Staff-Sun Ganqing
11th Army (consisted of two divisions) Commander-Chen Jiagui, Political Commissar-Zhang Qi
31st Infantry Division
32nd Infantry Division
13th Army(camed from Chengdu Military Region) Commander-Yan Shouqing, Political Commissar-Qiao Xueting
37th Infantry Division
38th Infantry Division
39th Infantry Division
14th Army Commander-Zhang Jinghua, Political Commissar-Fan Xinyou
40th Infantry Division
41st Infantry Division
42nd Infantry Division
149th Infantry Division (from Chengdu Military Region, belonged to 50th Corps, assigned to Yunnan Direction during the war)
Yunnan Military Region (as a provincial military region)
11th Regiment of Frontier Defence in Maguan County
12th Regiment of Frontier Defence in Malipo County
13th Regiment of Frontier Defence in
14th Regiment of Frontier Defence in
1st Garrison Division of Chengdu Military Region commanded by 11th Army in the war
65th Antiaircraft Artillery Division
4th Artillery Division
Independent Tank Regiment of Kunming Military Region
86th Bateau Boat Regiment
23rd Logistic Branch (consisted of five army service stations, six hospitals, eleven medical establishments)
17th Automobile Regiment commanded by 13th Corps during the war
22nd Automobile Regiment
5th Air Force Corps
44th Air Force Division (fighter unit)
Independent unit of 27th Air Force Division
15th Air Force Antiaircraft Artillery Division

Vietnamese forces

The Vietnamese government claimed they only had a force of about 70,000 including several army regular divisions in its northern area. However, the Chinese estimates indicate more than twice this number. Some Vietnamese forces used American military equipment captured during the Vietnam War.

1st Military Region: commanded by Major General Đàm Quang Trung, responsible for the defense at Northeast region.
Main forces:
3rd Infantry Division (Golden Star Division), consisted of 2nd Infantry Regiment, 12th Infantry Regiment, 141st Infantry Regiment and 68th Artillery Regiment. All were located at Dong Dang, Van Dang, Cao Loc and Lạng Sơn town of Lạng Sơn Province
338th Infantry Division, consisted of 460th Infantry Regiment, 461st Infantry Regiment, 462nd Infantry Regiment and 208th Artillery Regiment. All were located at Loc Binh and Dinh Lap of Lạng Sơn Province
346th Infantry Division (Lam Son Division), consisted of 246th Infantry Regiment, 677th Infantry Regiment, 851st Infantry Regiment and 188th Artillery Regiment. All were located at Tra Linh, Ha Quang and Hoa An of Cao Bằng Province
325th-B Infantry Division, consisted of 8th Infantry Regiment, 41st Infantry Regiment, 288th Infantry Regiment and 189th Artillery Regiment. All were located at Tien Yen and Binh Lieu of Quảng Ninh Province
242nd Infantry Brigade, located at coastlines and islands of Quảng Ninh Province
Local forces:
At Cao Bằng Province: 567th Infantry Regiment, 1 artillery battalion, 1 battalion of air defense artillery and 7 infantry battalions
At Lạng Sơn Province: 123rd Infantry Regiment, 199th Infantry Regiment and 7 infantry battalions
At Quảng Ninh Province: 43rd Infantry Regiment, 244th Infantry Regiment, 1 artillery battalion, 4 battalions of air defense artillery and 5 infantry battalions
Armed police forces (Border guard): 12th Mobile Regiment at Lang Son, 4 battalions at Cao Bang and Quang Ninh, some companies and 24 border posts

2nd Military Region: commanded by Major General Vu Lap, responsible for the defense at Northwest region.

Main forces:
316th Infantry Division (Bong Lau Division), consisted of 98th Infantry Regiment, 148th Infantry Regiment, 147th Infantry Regiment and 187th Artillery Regiment. All were located at Binh Lu and Phong Tho of Lai Châu Province
345th Infantry Division, consisted of 118th Infantry Regiment, 121st Infantry Regiment, 124th Infantry Regiment and 190th Artillery Regiment. All were located at Bao Thang of Hoang Lien Son province
 326th Infantry Division, consisted of 19th Infantry Regiment, 46th Infantry Regiment, 541st Infantry Regiment and 200th Artillery Regiment. All were located at Tuan Giao and Dien Bien of Lai Châu Province
Local forces:
At Ha Tuyen: 122nd Infantry Regiment, 191st Infantry Regiment, 1 artillery battalion and 8 infantry battalions
At Hoang Lien Son: 191st Infantry Regiment, 254th Infantry Regiment, 1 artillery battalion and 8 infantry battalions
At Lai Châu: 193rd Infantry Regiment, 741st Infantry Regiment, 1 artillery battalion and 5 infantry battalions
Armed police forces (Border guard): 16th Mobile Regiment at Hoang Lien Son, some companies and 39 border posts

In addition, Vietnamese forces were supported by about 50,000 militia at each Military Region

Air force
 372nd Air Division
 1 air flight of ten F-5s (captured after Vietnam War)
 1 air flight of ten A-37s (captured after Vietnam War)
 1 air flight of seven UH-1s and three UH-7s (captured after Vietnam War)
 919th Air Transport Regiment responsible for transporting troops
 Several C-130, C-119 and C-47 (captured after Vietnam War)
 371st Air Division
 916th Helicopter Regiment
 Several Mi-6 and Mi-8
 918th Air Transport Regiment
 923rd Fighter Regiment
 Several MiG-17s and MiG-21

The Vietnam People's Air Force did not participate in the combat directly, instead they provided support to the ground troops, transported troops from Cambodia to northern Vietnam as well as performed reconnaissance missions.

Air Defence
 Northern and Northwestern regions:
 267th Air Defence Regiment
 276th Air Defence Regiment
 285th Air Defence Regiment
 255th Air Defence Regiment
 257th Air Defence Regiment
 Northeastern region:
 274th Air Defence Regiment

Course of the war

On 17 February 1979, a People's Liberation Army (PLA) force of about 200,000 troops supported by 200 Type 59, Type 62, and Type 63 tanks entered northern Vietnam in the PLA's first major combat operation since the end of the Korean War in 1953.

The PLA invasion was conducted in two directions: western and eastern
 Western direction, commanded by Xu Shiyou, aimed to attack Cao Bằng, Lạng Sơn and Quảng Ninh Provinces:
 Eastern direction, commanded by Yang Dezhi, aimed to attack Ha Tuyen, Hoang Lien Son and Lai Châu Provinces

Vietnam quickly mobilized all its main forces in Cambodia, southern Vietnam and central Vietnam to the northern border. From 18 to 25 February, the 327th Infantry Division of Military District 3 and the 337th Infantry Division of Military District 4 were deployed to join Military District 1 for the defense of northwestern region. From 6 to 11 March the Second Corp (Huong Giang Corp) stationed in Cambodia was deployed back to Hanoi.

The 372nd Air Division in central Vietnam as well as the 917th, 935th and 937th Air Regiments in southern Vietnam were quickly deployed to the north.

The PLA quickly advanced about 15–20 kilometres into Vietnam, with fighting mainly occurring in the provinces of Cao Bằng, Lào Cai and Lạng Sơn. The Vietnamese avoided mobilizing their regular divisions, and held back some 300,000 troops for the defence of Hanoi. The People's Army of Vietnam (VPA) tried to avoid direct combat and often used guerrilla tactics.

The initial PLA attack soon lost its momentum and a new attack wave was sent in with eight PLA divisions joining the battle. After capturing the northern heights above Lạng Sơn, the PLA surrounded and paused in front of the city in order to lure the VPA into reinforcing it with units from Cambodia. This was the main strategic ploy in the Chinese war plan as Deng did not want to risk escalating tensions with the Soviet Union. After three days of bloody house-to-house fighting, Lạng Sơn fell on 6 March. The PLA then took the southern heights above Lạng Sơn and occupied Sa Pa. The PLA claimed to have crushed several of the VPA regular units. Supporting attacks were also conducted by the PLA at Quảng Ninh Province in the Battle of Mong Cai and Battle of Cao Ba Lanh but were unsuccessful.
According to Vietnam, since January 1979 Chinese forces performed numerous reconnaissance activities across the border and made 230 violations into Vietnamese land. To prepare for a possible Chinese invasion, the Central Military Committee of the Communist Party ordered all armed forces across the border to be on stand-by mode.

On 6 March, China declared that the gate to Hanoi was open and that their punitive mission had been achieved. During the withdrawal, the PLA used a scorched-earth policy, destroying local infrastructure and looting useful equipment and resources (including livestock), this severely weakened the economy of Vietnam's northernmost provinces. The PLA crossed the border back into China on 16 March. Both sides declared victory with China claiming to have crushed the Vietnamese resistance and Vietnam claiming to have repelled the invasion using mostly border militias. Henry J. Kenny, a research scientist for US Center for Naval Analyses, noted most Western writers agree that while Vietnam outperformed the PLA on the battlefield, the PLA's seizure of Lang Son did allow the Chinese the option of moving into the Red River Delta and thence into Hanoi. However, Kenny also mentions that Lang Son is farther from Hanoi than it is from the Chinese border, and at least 5 PAVN divisions in the delta remained ready for a counterattack and thirty thousand additional PAVN troops from Cambodia along with several regiments from Laos were moving to their support. Thus, had the PLA decided to attack Hanoi, the PLA would have suffered huge losses.

Soviet support to Vietnam
The Soviet Union, although it did not take direct military action, provided intelligence and equipment support for Vietnam. A large airlift was established by the Soviet Union to move Vietnamese troops from Cambodia to Northern Vietnam. Moscow also provided a total of 400 tanks and armored personnel carriers (APCs), 500 mortar artillery and air defense artillery, 50 BM-21 rocket launchers, 400 portable surface-to-air missiles, 800 anti-tank missiles and 20 jet fighters. About 5,000 to 8,000 Soviet military advisers were present in Vietnam in 1979 to  train Vietnamese soldiers.

During the Sino-Vietnamese War, the Soviet Union deployed troops at the Sino-Soviet border and Mongolian-Chinese border as an act of showing support to Vietnam, as well as tying up Chinese troops. However, the Soviets refused to take any direct action to defend their ally.

The Soviet Pacific Fleet also deployed 15 ships to the Vietnamese coast to relay Chinese battlefield communications to Vietnamese forces.

Soviet inaction
While the Soviet Union deployed naval vessels and supplied materiel to Vietnam, they felt that there was simply no way that they could directly support Vietnam against China; the distances were too great to be an effective ally, and any sort of reinforcements would have to cross territory controlled by China or U.S. allies. The only realistic option would be to restart the unresolved border conflict with China. Vietnam was important to Soviet policy but not enough for the Soviets to go to war over. When Moscow did not intervene, Beijing publicly proclaimed that the Soviet Union had broken its numerous promises to assist Vietnam.

Another reason why Moscow did not intervene was because Beijing had promised both Moscow and Washington that the invasion was only a limited war, and that Chinese forces would withdraw after a short incursion. After moderation by the U.S., Moscow decided to adopt a "wait and see" approach to see if Beijing would actually limit their offense. Because Vietnam's anti-air capabilities were among the best in the world at the time and in order to reassure Moscow it was conducting a limited war, Deng Xiaoping ordered the Chinese navy and air force to remain out of the war; only limited support was provided by the air force. When Beijing kept its promise, Moscow did not retaliate.

Aftermath

China and Vietnam each lost thousands of troops, and China lost 3.45 billion yuan in overhead, which delayed completion of their 1979–80 economic plan. Following the war, the Vietnamese leadership took various repressive measures to deal with the problem of real or potential collaboration. In the spring of 1979, the authorities expelled approximately 8,000 Hoa people from Hanoi to the southern "New Economic Zones", and partially resettled the Hmong tribes and other ethnic minorities from the northernmost provinces. In response to the defection of Hoàng Văn Hoan, the Communist Party of Vietnam removed from its ranks pro-Chinese elements and persons who had surrendered to the advancing Chinese troops during the war. In 1979, a total of 20,468 members were expelled from the party.

After the invasion, Vietnam created a puppet government in Cambodia led by Heng Samrin. Samrin was obligated to consult with the Vietnamese on major decisions. Although Vietnam continued to occupy Cambodia, China successfully mobilized international opposition to the occupation, rallying such leaders as Cambodia's deposed king Norodom Sihanouk, Cambodian anticommunist leader Son Sann, and high-ranking members of the Khmer Rouge to deny the pro-Vietnamese Cambodian People's Party in Cambodia diplomatic recognition beyond the Soviet bloc. China improved relations with ASEAN by promising protection to Thailand and Singapore against "Vietnamese aggression". In contrast, Vietnam's decreasing prestige in the region led it to be more dependent on the Soviet Union, to which it leased a naval base at Cam Ranh Bay. On 1 March 2005, Howard W. French wrote in The New York Times: Some historians stated that "the war was started by Mr. Deng (China's then paramount leader Deng Xiaoping) to keep the army preoccupied while he consolidated power..." 

Despite using a force that did not see major combat since the early 1950s and whose weaponry was inferior to the Vietnamese forces, the PLA was considered to have fought well. The PLA pushed Vietnamese forces  from the border and succeeded in severely damaging the area they occupied.

The Vietnamese forces had a combat-seasoned force and modern weapons.

After the war, border skirmishes at the Chinese-Vietnamese border continued; the Vietnamese government intensified its discriminatory policies against the Chinese community in Vietnam; and the Vietnamese were not deterred from maintaining their occupation of Cambodia, and increasing its control over Laos and threatening the security of Thailand, making Vietnam a greater threat to ASEAN than before.

However, China caused Vietnam to suffer from serious economic and military hardship by threatening to launch a second invasion, and by supporting Pol Pot guerrillas in Cambodia. The Vietnamese government had to spend money on maintaining a military presence at the Chinese-Vietnamese border, and on supporting its puppet government in Cambodia. Vietnam's scarce resources were drained, and economic conditions were bad throughout Vietnam.

Chinese casualties
The number of casualties during the war is disputed. Shortly after China had announced the withdrawal of its troops from Vietnam, the state-run Vietnam News Agency claimed that the PLA had suffered over 44,000 casualties, a figure which Western analysts at the time considered to be greatly inflated. Other Vietnamese sources claimed the PLA had suffered 62,500 total casualties, including 550 military vehicles, and 115 artillery pieces destroyed; while Chinese democracy activist Wei Jingsheng told western media in 1980 that the Chinese troops had suffered 9,000 dead and about 10,000 wounded during the war. Leaks from Chinese military sources indicate that China suffered 6,954 dead.

Deputy chief of the General Staff Wu Xiuquan revealed in a meeting with a French military delegation that Vietnam suffered 50,000 casualties, whereas China had suffered 20,000 casualties. Regardless of the accuracy of the Vietnamese casualties, it can be concluded that the Chinese losses were severe, according to Daniel Tretiak.

Vietnamese casualties
Like their Chinese counterparts, the Vietnamese government has never officially announced any information on its actual military casualties. China estimated that Vietnam lost 57,000 soldiers and 70,000 militia members during the war. The Vietnamese state newspaper Nhân Dân claimed that Vietnam suffered more than 10,000 civilian deaths during the Chinese invasion and earlier on 17 May 1979, reported statistics on heavy losses of industry and agricultural properties.

Prisoners

The Chinese held 1,636 Vietnamese prisoners and the Vietnamese held 238 Chinese prisoners; they were exchanged in May–June 1979.

The 238 Chinese soldiers surrendered after getting separated from their main unit during the withdrawal from Vietnam and became surrounded by Vietnamese. After surrendering, they were transferred by the Vietnamese soldiers to a prison. The Chinese prisoners reported that they were subjected to torturous and inhumane treatment, such as being blindfolded and having their bodies bound and restrained with metal wire.

Sino-Vietnamese relations after the war

Border skirmishes continued throughout the 1980s, including a significant skirmish in April 1984 and a naval battle over the Spratly Islands in 1988 known as the Johnson South Reef Skirmish. Armed conflict only ended in 1989 after the Vietnamese agreed to fully withdraw from Cambodia. Both nations planned the normalization of their relations in a secret summit in Chengdu in September 1990, and officially normalized ties in November 1991.

In 1999, after many years of negotiations, China and Vietnam signed a border pact. There was an adjustment of the land border, resulting in Vietnam giving China part of its land which was lost during the battle, including the Ai Nam Quan Gate which served as the traditional border marker and entry point between Vietnam and China, which caused widespread frustration within Vietnamese communities.

The December 2007 announcement of a plan to build a Hanoi–Kunming highway was a landmark in Sino-Vietnamese relations. The road will traverse the border that once served as a battleground. It is predicted to contribute to demilitarizing the border region, as well as facilitating trade and industrial cooperation between the nations.

In popular culture

Chinese media
There are a number of Chinese songs, movies and TV programs depicting and discussing this conflict from the Chinese viewpoint. These vary from the patriotic song "Bloodstained Glory" originally written to laud the sacrifice and service of the Chinese military, to the 1986 film The Big Parade which carried veiled criticism of the war. The 1984 Xie Jin film Wreaths at the Foot of the Mountain was the earliest mainland China film to depict the war, although its narrative was that the Chinese were on the defensive after Vietnamese attacked the Chinese border first with the objective of Nanning. The male protagonist of the television series Candle in the Tomb was a veteran of conflict.  The 2017 Chinese movie Youth covers the period of the Sino-Vietnamese conflict from the perspective of the larger cultural changes taking place in China during that period of time.

Vietnamese media
The war was mentioned in the film Đất mẹ (Motherland) directed by Hải Ninh in 1980 and Thị xã trong tầm tay (Town at the Fingertips) directed by Đặng Nhật Minh in 1982. Besides in 1982, a documentary film called Hoa đưa hương nơi đất anh nằm (Flowers over Your Grave) was directed by Truong Thanh, the film told a story of a Japanese journalist who died during the war.
During the war, there were numerous patriotic songs produced to boost the nationalism of Vietnamese people, including "Chiến đấu vì độc lập tự do" ("Fight for Independence and Freedom") composed by Phạm Tuyên, "Lời tạm biệt lúc lên đường" ("Farewell When Leaving") by Vu Trong Hoi, "40 thế kỷ cùng ra trận" ("40 Centuries We Fought Side By Side") by Hong Dang, "Những đôi mắt mang hình viên đạn" ("The Eyes Shaped Like Bullets") by Tran Tien and "Hát về anh" (Sing for you) by The Hien.
The Sino-Vietnamese War also appeared in some novels such as: Đêm tháng Hai (Night of February) written by Chu Lai in 1979 and Chân dung người hàng xóm (Portrait of My Neighbors) written by Duong Thu Huong in 1979.

See also

 List of wars involving the People's Republic of China
 List of wars involving Vietnam
 China–Vietnam relations
 Cambodian–Vietnamese War
 Sino-Soviet border conflict
 Sino-Vietnamese conflicts (1979–1991)

Notes

References

Citations

Sources

Books

 
 Liegl, Markus B. China's use of military force in foreign affairs: The dragon strikes (Taylor & Francis, 2017). excerpt 
 
 
 
 Zhang, Xiaoming. Deng Xiaoping's Long War: The Military Conflict Between China and Vietnam, 1979–1991 (U of North Carolina Press 2015) excerpt

Journal articles

 
 Path, Kosal. "China's Economic Sanctions against Vietnam, 1975–1978." China Quarterly (2012)  Vol. 212, pp 1040–1058.
 Path, Kosal. "The economic factor in the Sino-Vietnamese split, 1972–75: an analysis of Vietnamese archival sources." Cold War History 11.4 (2011): 519–555.
 Path, Kosal. "The Sino-Vietnamese Dispute over Territorial Claims, 1974–1978: Vietnamese Nationalism and its Consequences." International Journal of Asian Studies 8.2 (2011): 189–220. online
 
 Zhang, Xiaoming. "Deng Xiaoping and China's Decision to go to War with Vietnam." Journal of Cold War Studies 12.3 (2010): 3–29 online 
 Zhang, Xiaoming. "China's 1979 war with Vietnam: a reassessment." China Quarterly (2005): 851–874. online

Other

 Kurlantzick, Joshua. China-Vietnam Military Clash (Washington: Council on Foreign Relations, 2015). online

External links

 Analysis of the Sino-Vietnamese War at GlobalSecurity.org
 Order of Battle
 Air Power in the War
 G. D. Bakshi: The Sino-Vietnam War – 1979: Case Studies in Limited Wars
 "China's War Against Vietnam, 1979: A Military Analysis" at the School of Law, University of Maryland

Additional sources
 外国专家点评中国对越自卫反击战的战略战术 (The PLA's war strategy and tactic in the eyes of western experts) 
 对越自卫反击战：我军大量伤亡原因分析

 
1979 in China
1979 in Vietnam
20th century in Vietnam
Cold War conflicts
Conflicts in 1979
History of Vietnam (1945–present)
Invasions by China
Invasions of Vietnam
Proxy wars
Indochina Wars
Punitive expeditions
Warfare post-1945
Wars between China and Vietnam
Wars involving Vietnam
Wars involving the People's Republic of China